Conrad Caspar Hauser (16 February 1743 - 14 December 1824)  was a Swiss-Danish merchant, developer and phillantrophist. He contributed to the rebuilding of Copenhagen after the British bombardment of the city in 1807, building many of the houses on Hauser Plads which was later named after him. He was director of the Danish Asiatic Company from 1815 to 1824.

Early life and education
Hauser was born in Basel, the son of Rudolph Hauser (died 1766) and Catharina König (1708–86). In an early age he settled as a merchant in Marseille.

Career
Hauser became acquainted with the Danish envoy in Algier Andreas Æreboe and later married his sister. He was of assistance to a number of Danish naval ships stationed in the Mediterranean Sea and in 1776, upon recommendation of admiral Simon Hooglant, he was appointed as Royal Danish Agent with title of kommerceråd on condition that he would establish a trading house in Kiel. Hauser decided instead to move to Copenhagen where he joined Reinhard Iselin's trading house. Hauser presented Heinrich Carl von Schimmelmann with a plan for the establishment of a Danish West India Company which was established by royal charter on 11 May 1778 with Hauser as managing director.

Hauser lost some of his considerable wealth in connection with the financial crisis of 1813. He was a director of the Danish Asiatic Company in 1815-1823.

Property

Hauser lived at Åbenrå 41 from 1804 to 1913. After the bombardment of Copenhagen in 1807, Hauser purchased a number of lots with destroyed buildings in the area between Kultorvet and the street Åbenrå. He constructed a new street at the site which was given the name Hausergade after him in 1811. In 1819 he converted an undeveloped site at its eastern end into a new square, naming it Suhms Plads after the historian Peter Frederik Suhm who had lived at the site. The square was colloquially known as Hausers Plads and this name was officially adopted in the 1830s. Hauser's own house was from 1913 the still existing building at Hausers Plads 32.

Personal life
Hauser was married twice. His first wife was Karen Æreboe (1729-1810), a daughter of notarius publicus Rasmus Æreboe (1685–1744) and Catharina M. Aisberg (1706–54). They married on 6 March 1768 in Marseille. His second wife was Cicilia Marie Ludvigsen (1768-1844) a daughter of byfoged in Kalundborg  Ulrich Christian Ludvigsen (1725–1800) and Karen Cathrine Dietrichson (1740–1824). They married on  15 August 1813 in Church of Our Lady in Copenhagen.

Hauser belonged to the German Reformed congregation. He died on 14 December 1824 and is buried at Assistens Cemetery.

References

External links

 Conrad Hauser at geni.com

19th-century Danish businesspeople
18th-century Danish businesspeople
Danish Asiatic Company people
Swiss emigrants to Denmark
1743 births
1824 deaths